Jordan Andrew Wilson (born October 31, 1991) is a Canadian retired professional soccer player and sports television pundit for OneSoccer.

Early life
Wilson was born in Mississauga, Ontario.

Club career

Early career
In 2014, Wilson trialed with Danish Superliga side SønderjyskE. On February 10, 2015, he signed with Danish 2nd Division side Rishøj.

Nykøbing
In 2015, Wilson switched to fellow 2nd Division side Nykøbing He left the club in 2020, having made 138 league and ten cup appearances over five seasons.

York United
On October 22, 2020, Wilson returned to Canada, signing a one-year contract with Canadian Premier League side York United with options until 2023. He made his debut on June 27, 2021, in a 2–1 loss to Cavalry FC. In York's next match against Pacific FC on July 1, Wilson scored his first goal for the club. In December 2020 club president Angus McNab confirmed that the club has exercised Wilson's contract option, keeping him at the club through the 2022 Canadian Premier League season.

Wilson announced his retirement on January 18, 2023.

International career
In 2018, Wilson represented the Cascadia official soccer team at the 2018 CONIFA World Football Cup, making six appearances.

Media career 
Since the start of the 2021 Canadian Premier League season, Wilson has collaborated with Canadian sports streaming service OneSoccer, serving as a guest on the show’s studio panel and providing on-site coverage. In January 2023, he officially joined the platform as a full-time match analyst.

Career statistics

References

External links

1991 births
Living people
Association football midfielders
Canadian soccer players
Soccer players from Mississauga
Canadian expatriate soccer players
Expatriate soccer players in the United States
Canadian expatriate sportspeople in the United States
Expatriate men's footballers in Denmark
Canadian expatriate sportspeople in Denmark
Køge Nord FC players
Nykøbing FC players
York United FC players
Danish 2nd Division players
Danish 1st Division players
Canadian Premier League players
Cornerstone University alumni
College men's soccer players in the United States